The Temptation of Saint Anthony or The Torment of Saint Anthony is a c. 1521-1525 oil on panel painting by Giovanni Girolamo Savoldo, now in the Timken Museum of Art in San Diego. It may relate to the same artist's The Temptation of Saint Jerome on a similar theme.

Originally produced for a private studiolo, it is a homage to the work of Hieronymus Bosch, which Savoldo would have seen in cardinal Domenico Grimani's collection in Venice. From Bosch's The Hermit Saints he draws the motif of the saint fleeing to the left away from demons in a rocky infernal landscape on the right.

References

Paintings by Girolamo Savoldo
1525 paintings
Paintings in the collection of the Timken Museum of Art
Paintings of Anthony the Great